Kenneth Shaw Wriedt (11 July 192718 October 2010) was an Australian politician and leader of the Tasmanian branch of the Australian Labor Party.

Wriedt was born in Melbourne, of Danish ancestry.  His early life included time spent as a seaman. He was elected as an Australian Labor Party Senator for Tasmania at the 1967 Senate election.

When the Whitlam government won office at the December 1972 election, Wriedt (associated with the ALP's right wing) became Minister for Primary Industry.  In June 1974 his portfolio was renamed Agriculture.  On 14 October 1975, Rex Connor was obliged to resign as Minister for Minerals and Energy, as a result of the Loans Affair, and Wriedt was appointed in his place. Nevertheless, he served less than a month before the Whitlam government was dismissed on 11 November.  Wriedt remained in the Senate until his resignation in September 1980 to contest the House of Representatives seat of Denison at the 1980 federal election; he was defeated by sitting Liberal MP Michael Hodgman.

At the 1982 Tasmanian state election, Wriedt won a seat in the Tasmanian House of Assembly representing Franklin.  He was Leader of the Opposition from 1982 to 1986.  At the 1986 state election, Wriedt was unable to defeat the incumbent Liberal government of Robin Gray; Labor actually suffered a small swing.  He resigned as leader after the election, the first state Labor leader in more than half a century to have never served as Premier of Tasmania. He was a minister from 1989 to 1990 in the minority government led by Michael Field.  In October 1990 he retired from parliament.  He was the father of a subsequent Tasmanian House of Assembly member, Paula Wriedt.

References

 

1927 births
2010 deaths
Australian Labor Party members of the Parliament of Australia
Members of the Cabinet of Australia
Members of the Australian Senate
Members of the Australian Senate for Tasmania
1975 Australian constitutional crisis
Members of the Tasmanian House of Assembly
Australian people of Danish descent
Leaders of the Opposition in Tasmania
20th-century Australian politicians